Indian Springs is a census-designated place (CDP) in Polk County, Texas, United States. This was a new CDP for the 2010 census with a population of 785.

Geography
Indian Springs is located at  (30.687855, -94.744815).

Education
It is in the Livingston Independent School District.

References

Census-designated places in Polk County, Texas
Census-designated places in Texas